Ghost Chasers is a 1951 comedy film starring The Bowery Boys. The film was released on April 29, 1951 by Monogram Pictures and is the twenty-second film in the series.

Plot
After Slip discovers a spiritualist in the neighborhood, he enlists the boys to investigate.  They discover that she is a fake and working for Margo the Medium, a radio star who has convinced Sach and Whitey that ghosts exist.  They go to her place using Louie as a decoy.  While she is busy trying to connect to Louie's dead uncle, the rest of the boys investigate the house.  A real ghost, Edgar, befriends Sach and helps him investigate as well.  Although the others cannot see Edgar, he does help them in times of crisis and helps them uncover Margo's scam.

Cast

The Bowery Boys
Leo Gorcey as Terrance Aloysius 'Slip' Mahoney
Huntz Hall as Horace Debussy 'Sach' Jones
William Benedict as Whitmore 'Whitey' Williams
David Gorcey as Chuck
Buddy Gorman as Butch

Remaining cast
Bernard Gorcey as Louie Dumbrowski
Lloyd Corrigan as Edgar Alden Franklin Smith
 Jan Kayne as Cynthia
Robert Coogan as Jack Eagan, Private Eye
Lela Bliss as Margo the Medium
Philip Van Zandt as Dr. Basil Granville 
 Marshall Bradford  as	Professor Krantz
 Michael Ross as Gus
Argentina Brunetti as Mama Parelli 
Belle Mitchell as Madame Zola
 Doris Kemper as Mrs. Mahoney

Home media
Released on VHS by Warner Brothers on September 1, 1992.

Warner Archives released the film on made-to-order DVD in the United States as part of "The Bowery Boys, Volume Two" on April 9, 2013.

References

External links

1951 films
1951 horror films
1950s comedy horror films
American comedy horror films
American black-and-white films
Bowery Boys films
1950s English-language films
Films directed by William Beaudine
American ghost films
Monogram Pictures films
1950s ghost films
1951 comedy films
1950s American films